Preston Stratton Foster (August 24, 1900 – July 14, 1970), was an American actor of stage, film, radio, and television, whose career spanned nearly four decades. He also had a career as a vocalist.

Early life
Born in Ocean City, New Jersey, in 1900, Foster was the eldest of three children of New Jersey natives Sallie R. (née Stratton) and Walter Foster.  Preston had two sisters, Mabel and Anna; and according to federal census records, his family still lived in Ocean City in Cape May County at least as late as 1910.  There his father supported the family working as a painter.  Sometime between 1910 and 1918, the Fosters relocated to Pitman, New Jersey, where Preston's father was employed as a machinist.  The census for 1920 and Preston's earlier draft registration card from 1918 document that he continued to reside at that time at his parents' home at the intersection of Laurel and Snyder avenues in Pitman.  Those records document as well that he had a job as a clerk for the New York Ship Company in Camden, New Jersey, located about 17 miles north of Pitman.  A decade later, additional census records show that Foster had moved to Queens, New York, where he was living with his first wife, Gertrude, a widow and stage actress who was seven years his senior.  The federal census of 1930 also lists Foster as an actor by then, one employed in "Legitimate Vaudeville".

Stage and film career

Foster began working in films in 1929 after acting on Broadway, where he was still performing as late as November 1931 in the cast of Two Seconds. He soon reprised that stage role in Hollywood in the filmed version of the play.  Some of his subsequent films include Doctor X (1932), I Am a Fugitive from a Chain Gang (1932), Annie Oakley (1935), The Last Days of Pompeii (1935), The Informer (1935), Geronimo (1939), My Friend Flicka (1943), and Roger Touhy, Gangster (1944).

Over the years, as Foster's film experience in Hollywood grew, producers and directors gained increasing respect for his ability to play an array of characters, ranging from the "snarling family‐deserting criminal" in The People's Enemy in 1935 to the soft-spoken, fatherly chaplain on the Pacific battlefront in the 1943 film Guadalcanal Diary.  Once, when asked if he ever regretted performing in villainous roles, Foster gave some insight into his family's reaction to them:

Foster's career was interrupted by World War II, when he served with the United States Coast Guard.  While in active service he rose to the rank of captain, and later he was awarded the honorary rank of commodore in the Coast Guard Auxiliary.

Radio actor and vocalist
In addition to performing on stage and in numerous films, Foster was an accomplished singer who performed on both radio and in nightclubs, as well as a voice actor on radio.  On July 25, 1943, Foster co-starred with Ellen Drew in "China Bridge," a presentation of Silver Theater on CBS radio.  Foster also enjoyed a secondary career as a vocalist. In 1948, he created a trio consisting of himself, his second wife Sheila, and guitarist Gene Leis. Leis arranged the songs, and the trio performed on radio and in clubs, appearing with Orrin Tucker, Peggy Ann Garner and Rita Hayworth.

Television work
In 1950, Foster began performing on the young but rapidly expanding medium of television.  His first credited role on the "small screen" was in September of that year on the NBC anthology series Cameo Theatre, in an episode titled "The Westland Case". Later, after a few other appearances on series, he starred in the televised drama Waterfront, playing Captain John Herrick during the 1954-1955 broadcast season. He also guest-starred in 1963 in the ABC drama series Going My Way, starring Gene Kelly.

Personal life and death
Foster was married twice, the first time to actress Gertrude Elene (Warren) Leonard, a widow who had been born in Woodbury, New Jersey in 1893.  The two wed on June 27, 1925, in Manhattan, where they both worked as actors.  In the early 1930s, the couple left New York City and relocated to Los Angeles.  There, in 1939, they adopted a daughter, Stephanie; but six years later Preston and Gertrude divorced.

During times between his performances in films and on television, Foster often enjoyed boating and deep-sea fishing, especially for marlin, off California's southern coast. He continued to accept acting offers in his later years, although far less regularly during the final decade of his life. His last film credit was in the role of Nick Kassel in Chubasco, which was released just two years before his death.

During his later years, Foster lived in the seaside community of La Jolla, California, part of the city of San Diego. In 1969, when the San Diego Padres made their debut as a Major League Baseball team, Foster wrote a song titled "Let's Go Padres", which was billed as the team's official song. He sang it at some home games that season. Foster died in 1970 at age 69 in La Jolla after what The New York Times described as "a long illness."

Honors
Preston Foster has a star on the Hollywood Walk of Fame at 6801 Hollywood Blvd.

Filmography

Pusher-in-the-Face (1929, Short) (film debut)
Nothing but the Truth (1929) as Nightclub Patron (uncredited)
Heads Up (1930) as Blake
Follow the Leader (1930) as Two-Gun Terry
His Woman (1931) as Crewman (uncredited)
Two Seconds (1932) as Bud Clark
Doctor X (1932) as Dr. Wells
The Last Mile (1932) as John 'Killer' Mears - Cell 4
Life Begins (1932) as Dr. Brett
The All American (1932) as Steve Kelly
I Am a Fugitive from a Chain Gang (1932) as Pete
You Said a Mouthful (1932) as Ed Dover
Sensation Hunters (1933) as Tom Baylor
Ladies They Talk About (1933) as David Slade
Elmer, the Great (1933) as Walker
Dangerous Crossroads (1933) as Gang Leader
Corruption (1933) as Tim Butler
The Man Who Dared (1933) as Jan Novak
Devil's Mate (1933) as Insp. O'Brien
Hoop-La (1933) as Nifty Miller
Just Around the Corner (1933, Short) as Tim - Office Worker
Heat Lightning (1934) as George
Wharf Angel (1934) as Como Murphy
Sleepers East (1934) as Jason Everett
The Band Plays On (1934) as Howdy Hardy
Strangers All (1935) as Murray Carter
The People's Enemy (1935) as Vince M. Falcone
The Informer (1935) as Dan Gallagher
A Night at the Biltmore Bowl (1935, Short) as Preston Foster
The Arizonian (1935) as Tex Randolph
The Last Days of Pompeii (1935) as Marcus
Annie Oakley (1935) as Toby Walker
We're Only Human (1935) as Det. Sgt. Pete 'Mac' McCaffrey
Muss 'Em Up (1936) as Tippecanoe 'Tip' O'Neil
Love Before Breakfast (1936) as Scott Miller
The Plough and the Stars (1936) as Jack Clitheroe
We Who Are About to Die (1937) as Steven Mathews
Sea Devils (1937) as Michael 'Mike' O'Shay
The Outcasts of Poker Flat (1937) as John Oakhurst
You Can't Beat Love (1937) as James Ellsworth 'Jimmy' Hughes
The Westland Case (1937) as Bill Crane - Private Detective
First Lady (1937) as Stephen Wayne
Everybody's Doing It (1938) as Bruce Keene
Double Danger (1938) as Bob Crane
The Lady in the Morgue (1938) as Det. Bill Crane
Army Girl (1938) as Capt. Dike Conger
The Storm (1938) as Jack Stacey
Submarine Patrol (1938) as Lt. (j.g.) John C. Drake
Up the River (1938) as 'Chipper' Morgan
The Last Warning (1938) as Bill Crane
Society Smugglers (1939) as Richard 'Sully' Sullivan
Chasing Danger (1939) as Steve Mitchell
News Is Made at Night (1939) as Steve Drum
20,000 Men a Year (1939) as Jim Howell
Missing Evidence (1939) as Bill Collins
Geronimo (1939) as Captain Bill Starrett
Cafe Hostess (1940) as Dan Walters
North West Mounted Police (1940) as Sergeant Jim Brett
Moon Over Burma (1940) as Bill Gordon
The Round Up (1941) as Greg Lane
Unfinished Business (1941) as Steve Duncan
Secret Agent of Japan (1942) as Roy Bonnell
A Gentleman After Dark (1942) as Police Detective Tom Gaynor
Night in New Orleans (1942) as Police Lt. Steve Abbott
Little Tokyo, U.S.A. (1942) as Michael Steele
Thunder Birds (1942) as Steve Britt
American Empire (1942) as Paxton Bryce
My Friend Flicka (1943) as Rob McLaughlin
Guadalcanal Diary (1943) as Father Donnelly
Bermuda Mystery (1944) as Steve Carramond
Roger Touhy, Gangster (1944) as Roger Touhy
Thunderhead, Son of Flicka (1945) as Rob McLaughlin
The Valley of Decision (1945) as Jim Brennan
Twice Blessed (1945) as Jeff Turner
Abbott and Costello in Hollywood (1945) as Himself (uncredited)
The Harvey Girls (1946) as Judge Sam Purvis
Tangier (1946) as Col. Jose Artiego
Strange Triangle (1946) as Sam Crane
Inside Job (1946) as Bart Madden
Ramrod (1947) as Frank Ivey
King of the Wild Horses (1947) as Dave Taggert
The Hunted (1948) as Johnny Saxon
Thunderhoof (1948) as Scotty Mason
I Shot Jesse James (1949) as John Kelley
The Big Cat (1949) as Tom Eggers
The Tougher They Come (1950) as Joe MacKinley
Three Desperate Men (1951) as Tom Denton
Tomahawk (1951) as Col. Carrington
The Big Gusher (1951) as Henry 'Hank' Mason
The Big Night (1951) as Andy La Main
Montana Territory  (1952) as Sheriff Henry Plummer
Kansas City Confidential (1952) as Tim Foster
Law and Order (1953) as Kurt Durling
The Marshal's Daughter (1953) as Poker-Game Player #1
I, the Jury (1953) as Capt. Pat Chambers
Waterfront (1954-1955, TV) as Cap'n John Herrick 
Destination 60,000 (1957) as Col. Ed Buckley
Gunslinger (1961, TV) as Capt. Zachary Wingate
Going My Way (1963, TV) as Francis X. Finnegan
77 Sunset Strip (1964, TV) as Boss Gates
Advance to the Rear (1964) as Gen. Bateman (uncredited)
The Time Travelers (1964) as Dr. Erik von Steiner
You've Got to Be Smart (1967) as D.A. Griggs
Chubasco (1967) as Nick (final film)

References and notes

External links

 

1900 births
1970 deaths
American male film actors
American male stage actors
American male television actors
20th-century American male actors
United States Coast Guard personnel of World War II
United States Coast Guard officers
Male actors from New Jersey
People from Pitman, New Jersey
People from Ocean City, New Jersey
Burials in California
Military personnel from New Jersey